The Osborne Executive is the successor of the already commercially successful Osborne 1 portable computer by Osborne Computer Corporation. The Executive consists of a collection of the good features from the Osborne 1 and fixes some of its predecessor's perceived flaws.

The Osborne Executive, like the Osborne 1, comes with application software. The WordStar word processor, SuperCalc spreadsheet, and the CBASIC and MBASIC programming languages—all software packages that were the leading applications in their respective niches at the time—had a retail value of more than US$2,495.

The disk drives and built-in 7-inch amber CRT are covered by the keyboard when snapped on to the main case for transportation. Like the Osborne 1, the Executive can be supported by the keyboard at a convenient viewing angle. The Executive includes a cooling fan, unlike the Osborne 1, and a tiny air filter for it.

Software
The operating system is CP/M version 3.0.  A complete listing of the ROM BIOS is available in the Osborne technical manual. Unlike version 2.2, this edition of CP/M supports bank switching memory; this allows compatible programs to use more RAM.  An alternative OS, the UCSD p-System is also included.

Compatibility
The CP/M BIOS of the Executive can automatically detect and use single-sided disks formatted in the following systems:

 Osborne 1
 IBM PC running CP/M-86
 DEC VT180
 Xerox 820
 Commodore 128

Many CP/M systems of the time cannot read diskettes formatted for any other brand (sometimes, for other models of  the same brand) without using third-party special purpose interchange software. This built-in feature provides a useful amount of flexibility in exchanging data with other systems.

The Executive can also emulate certain models of computer terminal (which is useful for dial-up access to remote systems):

 VT100
 ADM-3A
 Hazeltine
 Hewlett-Packard

Use
The Osborne Executive is useful for presentations and projects at client sites. Unlike static presentations, the portable computer can provide on-the-spot answers to numeric questions when working with consulting clients. This laid the groundwork for the kind of 'show me the money' ROI or TCO presentations commonplace today.

A number of Executives have custom ROM's which were personalized when booted; name plates were also etched onto the casing.

The Executive was only produced in limited numbers compared to the predecessor Osborne 1, before the company filed for Chapter 11 bankruptcy. The financial problems of the Osborne company were aggravated by early announcement of the Executive, which cut into sales of the Osborne 1.  This so-called Osborne effect has become proverbial as a mistake that can be made by companies trading in high-technology products.

The company had announced yet another successor product, the Osborne Vixen, but went out of business before the Vixen could be established.  An Osborne Executive II, using an 8088 processor, and providing MS-DOS and IBM PC compatibility, was announced but never produced.

Hardware

Features
 Dual half-height 5¼-inch, single-sided double-density 40 track floppy disk drives with 160 KB capacity (Shugart Associates standard, unlike the Osborne 1)
 4 MHz Z80A CPU
 124 KB main memory
 Fold-down keyboard doubling as the computer case's lid
 7-inch, 80 character × 24 line amber monochrome CRT display
 IEEE-488 port configurable as a parallel printer port
 Two RS-232 compatible 2400/1200 or 300 baud serial ports for use with external modems or serial printers
External composite video monitor connection
Storage pocket for up to eight 5¼-inch disks

The Osborne Executive is powered by a wall plug, and has no internal battery, although an aftermarket battery pack offering 1-hour run time was available.

Size
 Width: 
 Height: 
 Depth: 
 Weight:

Upgrades and Enhancements 
Despite having single-sided drives the Executive motherboard is wired to support double-sided drives, providing the SIDE signal from the disk controller socket to the drive connector but is unused by the shipped single-sided Western Digital FD1793 floppy-disk controller.

An upgrade kit to 360 KB double-sided, double-density drives was briefly available from Future Systems, consisting of two new DSDD drives, a drop-in replacement FD1797 disk controller, ROM (1.3) upgrade and an upgraded CP/M BIOS (1.4) and utilities which provides backward compatibility for SSSD/SSDD disks as well as the newer format used by the Osborne Vixen.

An 11 MB Hard disk drive option was available from Gard Micro Systems; installation requires the removal of one floppy drive to accommodate the new drive, a new logic board and fitting a more powerful mains voltage fan.

The motherboard also provides a pin header (P12) giving connections to the CPU, RAM and video memory and direct memory access for possible future internal expansion via a daughterboard.

References

External links
 Computer Museum Page 
 Computer Closet Page
 Atari Magazine Review of the Osborne Executive
 Rhode Island Computer Museum
 Starring the Computer - The Osborne Executive can be seen in the 1984 film The Philadelphia Experiment.
 Video Osborne Executive Retro Computer museum, Zatec, Czech Republic

Computer-related introductions in 1983
Personal computers
Portable computers
Z80-based computers